Gunda is a genus of moths of the family Bombycidae (silk moths). The genus was erected by Francis Walker in 1862. It is primarily an Oriental genus, found in India, China and South-east Asia.

Species
Gunda aroa Bethune-Baker, 1904
Gunda engonata (Swinhoe, 1899)
Gunda javanica (Moore, 1872)
Gunda ochracea Walker, 1862
Gunda proxima Roepke, 1924
Gunda subnotata (Walker, 1859)
Gunda thwaitesii (Moore, 1883)

References

Bombycidae

hu:Gunda